Udhwa (also spelled Udhua) is a village in the Uddhwa CD block in the Rajmahal subdivision of the Sahibganj district in the Indian state of Jharkhand.

Etymology
Udhwa is named after saint Uddhava of Mahabharat times, a friend of God Krishna and philosopher of Sankhya Yoga (Samkhya). It is believed that Udhwa was the place of Saint Uddhava.

History

Battle of Udhwa nala
The Battle of Udhwa nala between Mir Qasim, and the British (1763) was centered here. Mir Qasim was Nawab (King) of Bengal (including areas of present days Bangladesh and Indian states West Bengal, Bihar, Jharkhand and Orissa). Nawab Mir Qasim was defeated by the British and fled with his family to the Rohtas, Bihar, but was not able to hide at the Rohtasgarh Fort, which the Diwan of Rohtas, Shahmal, finally handed over to British captain Goddard.

Geography

Location

Overview
Rajmahal coalfield is shown in the map. The entire area is overwhelmingly rural with only small pockets of urbanisation.

Note: The full screen map is interesting. All places marked on the map are linked and you can easily move on to another page of your choice. Enlarge the map to see what else is there – one gets railway links, many more road links and so on.

Udhwa Bird Sanctuary
Udhwa Bird Sanctuary, spreading in 5.65 square kilometers is  the only bird sanctuary of Jharkhand state. This avian habitat comprises two backwater lakes over river Ganges (Ganga) namely Patauda and Berhale. Migratory birds reach here every winter from several parts of the World, including Siberia and Europe. The main birds include the pratincole, egret, wagtail, plover, lapwing, stork, ibis and heron.

Demographics
According to the 2011 Census of India, Udhua had a total population of 13,139, of which 6,719 (51%) were males and 6,420 (49%) were females. Population in the age range 0–6 years was 2,744. The total number of literate persons in Udhua was 5,382 (51.77% of the population over 6 years).

Civic administration

CD block HQ
Headquarters of the Udhwa CD block is at Udhwa village.

See also
 Ganges(Ganga) River
 Barharwa

References

Villages in Sahibganj district